Gundars is a Latvian masculine given name and may refer to:

Gundars Āboliņš (born 1960), Latvian actor
Gundars Bērziņš (born 1959), Latvian accountant and politician
Gundars Bojārs (born 1967), Latvian politician
Gundars Celitāns (born 1985), Latvian volleyball player
Gundars Daudze (born 1965), Latvian physician and politician
Gundars Vētra (born 1967), Latvian basketball player

See also
Gundar (disambiguation)

Latvian masculine given names